Angelica Patricia Michibata, simply known as , (born December 5, 1985) is   Japanese model of Argentine-Italian descent. She and her sisters,  Jessica and Karen, are called the "Michibata Sanshimai". She is a prominent model for S Cawaii!.

Life and career
Michibata was born to a Japanese mother and an Argentine father of Spanish and Italian descent. Her sisters Jessica and Karen also work as fashion models. Michibata also has an older brother.

In July 2012, she was appointed an image character for the color contact lens brand, TeAmo. Michibata was appointed with Ai Haruna.

Filmography

Magazines

TV series

Advertising

Catalogs

Events

Awards
2011
 Tennen Cosmetics Beauty Award Model Bumon
2014
 27th Nihon Megane Best Dresser-sho Sunglasse Bumon

References

External links
 Official profile 

Japanese female models
1985 births
Living people
Models from Fukui Prefecture
Japanese people of Italian descent
Japanese people of Argentine descent
Japanese people of Spanish descent